Łukasz Wargala is a Grand Prix motorcycle racer from Poland.

Career statistics

By season

Races by year

References

External links
 Profile on motogp.com

Polish motorcycle racers
Living people
1983 births
Moto2 World Championship riders
People from Zielona Góra
Sportspeople from Lubusz Voivodeship